"Improbable Cause" is the 66th episode of the television series Star Trek: Deep Space Nine, the 20th episode of the third season. It is the first half of a two-part episode, concluded in the following episode, "The Die is Cast".

Set in the 24th century, the series follows the adventures of the crew of the space station Deep Space Nine near the planet Bajor, adjacent to a wormhole connecting the Alpha and Gamma Quadrants of the galaxy, as the Bajorans recover from a decades-long occupation by the imperialistic Cardassians. The Gamma Quadrant is home to a hostile empire known as the Dominion, ruled by the shapeshifting Founders.

In this episode, Deep Space Nine's security chief Odo investigates a bombing at the clothing shop of Cardassian spy-turned-tailor Elim Garak, leading him to discover secret Cardassian maneuvering against the Dominion.

Plot
When Garak's shop explodes, Odo finds that it was destroyed by a bomb set up to make it look accidental. He tracks down a possible suspect but before he can catch up with him, the suspect is killed when his ship blows up.

Odo studies the case further and discovers evidence that the Romulans, a rival alien race, are behind it. They probably hired the dead suspect, and then killed him to help bury evidence. Odo digs up more information about the incident and finds that it is much more complicated than an assassination attempt on Garak. It seems the Romulans are planning to invade Cardassia and several members of the Obsidian Order, the Cardassian secret police, have been killed in mysterious mishaps recently.

Odo tries to get Garak to admit that he blew up his own shop in order to get Odo to begin an investigation. All of the Cardassians recently killed were close to Enabran Tain, Garak's Obsidian Order mentor. Now that all of his associates are being targeted, Tain may be in danger. Odo and Garak set off to locate him.

En route they are captured by a Romulan starship. When they are brought aboard they find Tain is there. He tells them he ordered Garak's assassination, as well as those of the rest of his former associates. He is wiping his history clean in preparation for a power play. The Tal Shiar, the Romulan intelligence agency, have formed an alliance with the Obsidian Order, and they are planning an attack on the Founders in the Gamma Quadrant. Once the Dominion is taken out, Tain plans to take control of the Obsidian Order. Since his attempt on Garak's life failed, he asks Garak to join him, and Garak immediately agrees.

Arc significance
This episode and its successor, "The Die Is Cast", are a pivotal moment in the timeline of Deep Space Nine, one which would define the plotline for the remainder of the series. After several episodes establishing the Dominion as a threat, beginning with "The Jem'Hadar", the events of this episode make the eventual war between the Dominion and the Alpha Quadrant inevitable.  The repercussions of the events depicted in this episode resonate throughout the remainder of the series, as the attempted preemptive invasion of the Gamma Quadrant by the joint Romulan and Cardassian fleet leads to the crippling of the Obsidian Order, a war between the Cardassians and Klingons, and the eventual absorption of Cardassia into the Dominion, which precipitates the beginning of the war between the Dominion and the United Federation of Planets, which occupies the final two seasons of Deep Space Nine.

Reception
In 2015, Geek.com recommended this episode as "essential watching" for their abbreviated Star Trek: Deep Space Nine binge-watching guide, pairing it with the following episode "The Die is Cast". They note this duet of episodes is Garak-centric, and also includes special-effect scenes of space battles.

The Hollywood Reporter rated "Improbable Cause" as the 71st best episode of Star Trek overall, noting its mystery and intrigue. They also ranked it the 20th best episode in  Star Trek: Deep Space Nine in 2016. In this episode the Station's main detective, the alien-shape shifter Odo, investigates an attack on Garak's shop.

In 2018, CBR rated "Improbable Cause" coupled with its second part "The Die Is Cast", as the 12th best multi episode story arc of Star Trek.

As a pair with the following episode "The Die Is Cast", "Improbable Cause" was ranked as the 6th best episode of Star Trek: Deep Space Nine by Vulture. They highlight the character of Garak, played by Andrew Robinson.
Den of Geek also reviewed it paired with "The Die Is Cast", and ranked it among the best of the series in 2019.

Releases 
This episode was released on LaserDisc in Japan on October 2, 1998, in the half-season collection 3rd Season Vol. 2.  The set included episodes from "Destiny" to "The Adversary" on double sided 12 inch optical discs; the box set had a total runtime of 552 minutes and included audio tracks in English and Japanese.

This episode was released on VHS paired with "Through the Looking Glass".

References

External links

 

Star Trek: Deep Space Nine (season 3) episodes
1995 American television episodes
Star Trek: Deep Space Nine episodes in multiple parts
Television episodes directed by Avery Brooks